The Kenya Medical Research Institute (KEMRI) is a state corporation established through the Science and Technology (Amendment) Act of 1979, (since amended to the Sciences, Technology and Innovation Act 2013), during the tenure of Nicholas Biwott as Minister of State, as the national body responsible for carrying out health research in Kenya.

KEMRI is the medical research arm of the Kenya Government providing advice on various aspects of healthcare and delivery, including national diseases surveillance and rapid rehttps://www.kemri.org/sponse capacity for major disease outbreaks such as HIV, Cholera, Chikungunya Virus, H1N1 Flu, Yellow Fever, Rift Valley Fever, Ebola, Aflatoxicosis and COVID-19.

KEMRI is mandated to carry out research in human health; to cooperate with other research organizations and institutions of higher learning on matters of relevant research and training;  to work with other research bodies within and outside Kenya carrying out similar research; to cooperate with the Ministry of Public Health and Sanitation, the Ministry of Medical Services, the National Council of Science and Technology (NSCT) and the Medical Science Advisory Research Committee in matters pertaining to research policies and priorities.

KEMRI has grown over the last 40 years to become a regional leader in human health research. The institute currently ranks as one of the leading Centres of excellence in health research both in Africa and globally.

Locations
KEMRI Research includes the following centers:

 Centre for Biotechnology Research and Development (CBRD):Mandate is to develop biotechnological innovations such as diagnostic kits, vaccines and associated delivery technology
 Centre for Clinical Research (CCR)
 Centre for Geographic Medicine Research-Coast (CGMR-C)
 Centre for Global Health Research (CGHR)
 Centre for Infectious and Parasitic Diseases Control Research (CIPDCR)
 Centre for Microbiology Research (CMR)
 Centre for Public Health Research (CPHR)
 Centre for Respiratory Diseases Research (CRDR)
 Centre for Traditional Medicine and Drug Research (CTMDR)
 Centre for Virus Research (CVR) 
 The Eastern and Southern Africa Centre of International Parasite Control (ESACIPAC)
 KEMRI Graduate School of Health Sciences
 Health Safety and Environment
 Production Centre

Partners 
KEMRI has links with a number of international, regional and local partners. 

INTERNATIONAL PARTNERS

The Wellcome (Trust),  a global charitable foundation dedicated to improving health and research.

The US Centre for Disease Control and Prevention (CDC).  

The Japan International Cooperation Agency (JICA).  

The United States Army Medical Research Directorate – Kenya.  

The World Health Organization.  

The US Agency for International Development (USAID).

The British Medical Research Council.  

KIT Royal Tropical Institute (Amsterdam).  

The World Association of Industrial and Technological Research Organization (WAITRO).  

REGIONAL PARTNERS

Ghana National Institute of Medical Research.  

Ethiopia Health and Nutrition Research Institute. 

Ethiopia Virus Research Institute.

Makere University Medical School.

University of Zambia Medical School.  

LOCAL PARTNERSHIPS

Jomo Kenyatta University of Agriculture and Technology.  

University of Nairobi. 

Maseno University.

References

External links  
 KEMRI Homepage

Medical research institutes
Research institutes in Kenya
Medical and health organisations based in Kenya
National public health agencies